Ernest Chavez (born February 6, 1937 in Albuquerque, New Mexico) is an American politician and a Democratic former member of the New Mexico House of Representatives representing District 12, first elected in 2004 and serving since 2005. He did not seek reelection in 2014.

Education
Chavez graduated Albuquerque High School and Albuquerque Business College.

Elections
 2012 Chavez and returning 2008 and 2010 Republican challenger Clyde Wheeler were both unopposed for their June 5, 2012 primaries setting up a direct rematch; Chavez won the November 6, 2012 General election with 4,736 votes (71.8%) against Wheeler.
 1992 To challenge District 12 incumbent Democratic Representative Delano Garcia, Chavez ran in the June 2, 1992 Democratic Primary but lost to Representative Garcia who was unopposed for the November 3, 1992 General election, and was re-elected.
 1994 Again challenging Representative Garcia, Chavez ran in the three-way June 7, 1994 Democratic Primary but Chavez and Representative Garcia lost to James Taylor who was unopposed for the November 8, 1994 General election, and was elected, winning re-election in 1996, 1998, 2000, and 2002.
 2004 District 12 incumbent Democratic Representative Taylor was challenged in the June 1, 2004 Democratic Primary but won; when Taylor was appointed to the New Mexico Senate, Chavez replaced him on the November 2, 2004 General election ballot, and was unopposed, winning with 5,730 votes.
 2006 Chavez was unopposed for both the June 6, 2006 Democratic Primary, winning with 1,008 votes and the November 7, 2006 General election, winning with 4,608 votes.
 2008 Chavez was unopposed for both the June 8, 2008 Democratic Primary, winning with 1,852 votes and won the three-way November 4, 2008 General election with 6,265 votes (65.5%) against Republican nominee Clyde Wheeler and Independent Robert Schiller.
 2010 Chavez, Clyde Wheeler, and Robert Schiller were all unopposed for their June 1, 2010 primaries, setting up a rematch; Chavez won the three-way November 2, 2010 General election with 3,945 votes (58.3) against Wheeler and Schiller.

References

External links
 Representative Ernest H. Chavez - (D) at the New Mexico Legislature
 
 Ernest Chavez, Sr. at Ballotpedia
 Ernest Chavez at OpenSecrets

1937 births
Hispanic and Latino American state legislators in New Mexico
Living people
Democratic Party members of the New Mexico House of Representatives
Politicians from Albuquerque, New Mexico